The Chicago Marathon, one of the six World Marathon Majors, has been contested by men and women annually since 1977.  Since 1983, it has been held annually in October.  The United States had been represented by the most Chicago Marathon winners (nine men and twelve women).  After a seventh consecutive win by a Kenyan man in 2009, Kenyan men have won more times (ten) than men representing any other country. The United Kingdom is in third place in total victories (eight), victories by men (five) and victories by women (three).  All four of Brazil's victors have been men, and all three of Portugal's winners have been women.

History
The first six pairs of races were swept by the United States.  Runners representing the United Kingdom won both races in 1996 (Paul Evans and Marian Sutton).  Kenya has been victorious in both races twice (1998 and 2001) and is the most recent country to do so, with representatives Ben Kimondiu and Catherine Ndereba.  Deena Kastor, the 2005 female winner, is the last victor from the host nation.  Although four-time winner Khalid Khannouchi represented the United States during his 2000 and 2002 victories after becoming an American citizen, the last American-born male winner prior to 2017 was Greg Meyer. Galen Rupp became the first American-born male to win the race in 35 years with his 2017 victory. 1979 winner Laura Michalek of the United States was just 15 years old.

Khannouchi's four victories is the most by any contestant.  There have been several two-time winners including Khannouchi, five men and six women. Four of the five male two-time winners have been consecutive winners (most recently Evans Rutto in 2002 and 2003), and six of the seven two-time female victors have been consecutive (most recently Berhane Adere in 2006 and 2007). No one other than Khannouchi has won three races and no one has won three consecutively.

There have been two male and two female world records for the fastest marathon time set in the race.  The United Kingdom has had both a male and a female fastest marathon world record in Chicago. The women's world record was once set by Paula Radcliffe, who succeeded Catherine Ndereba as a world record holder in 2002.  The record has been set in 2019 by Brigid Kosgei.  Khannouchi set the last male fastest marathon world record in the Chicago Marathon in 1999.  After Ndereba set the record in 2001, both the men's and women's current fastest marathon world records had been set in the Chicago Marathon.

Winners

Key: Course record (in bold)

Wheelchair division

Country summary

Notes

References

External links

Marathon
Chicago